The Admire Group is a geologic group in Nebraska. It preserves fossils dating back to the Carboniferous period.

See also

 List of fossiliferous stratigraphic units in Nebraska
 Paleontology in Nebraska

References
 

Carboniferous System of North America
Geologic groups of Nebraska